The 2018 Billboard Music Awards ceremony was held at the MGM Grand Garden Arena in Las Vegas, Nevada on May 20, 2018. It was the first ceremony to be broadcast on NBC. The list of nominees were announced on April 17, 2018. The show was hosted by Kelly Clarkson and was sponsored by Xfinity, Pepsi, T-Mobile, Uber, and 23andMe.

Performers

Winners and nominees
Winners are listed first and bold.

Multiple wins and nominations

References

Billboard Music Award
Billboard awards
2018 in Nevada
2018 music awards
Billboard Music Awards